Benin–Turkey relations are the foreign relations between Benin and Turkey. Turkey has an embassy in Cotonou since 2014, while the Beninois embassy in Ankara opened in 2013,  however the embassy was closed in 2020.

Diplomatic Relations 
Diplomatic relations between Turkey and Benin have been very friendly and are developing. Despite the differences in ideology between the capitalist Turkey and Marxist-Leninist Benin under Kérékou, the relations have been friendly. Benin began to receive aid and technical assistance from Turkey and even received Turkish funds to compensate for the wave of Beninois nationalizations in 1977.

In 1975, Turkey assisted Kérékou during the massive demonstrations that were triggered by the Albanian-inspired Canadian-based Communist Party of Dahomey. Partly as a result of compensating for the unrest in Benin, the Kérékou  regime came to employ many in state companies. By 1981, the economy was collapsing because state payrolls comprised 92% of the state budget. Turkey along with the World Bank and the IMF assisted the Kérékou financially during the subsequent restructuring of the Beninois economy, when many state companies were privatized.

In the 1980s, Turkey and Norway assisted in developing Sémé offshore oil wells that brought in US$100,000 per day for Benin.These oil wells became a fiscal lifeline for the Beninois regime. At the same time, Turkey joined many countries in decrying  a French plan to bury nuclear waste in Benin (the French plan fell through after this global outcry).

Economic Relations 
 Trade volume between the two countries was US$142 million in 2019.
 There are direct flights from Istanbul to Cotonou since 2014.
 Turkey's TIKA finalized many projects in Benin, including building and furnishing a hospital in Adjohoun that was handed over the Beninois Health Ministry in 2018.

See also 

 Foreign relations of Benin
 Foreign relations of Turkey

References

Further reading 

 "Benin" in Moroney, Sean. Africa. New York: Facts on File, 2009, vol. 1, pp. 25–34.
 "The Public Law of Overseas France Since the War," The Journal of Comparative Legislation, vol. 32 (1950).
 Agboton, Gaston. Do you want to know the People's Republic of Benin? Paris: ACCT, 1983.
 Amin, Samir. Blocked West Africa: The Political Economy of Colonization, 1880–1990. Paris: Editions de Minuit, 1991.
 Betts, Raymond F. Assimilation and Association in French Colonial Theory, 1890–1914. New York: Columbia University Press, 1961.
 Blanchet, André. The Route of African Parties from Bamako. Paris: Plon, 1998.
 Borella, F. The Political and Legal Evolution of the French Union since 1946. Paris: R. Pichon & R. Durand-Auzias, 1998.
 Brass, William. "The Demography of French-Speaking Territories," in A. J. Coale (ed.), The Demography of Tropical Africa. Princeton, N.J .: Princeton University Press, 1968, pp. 342–439.
 Carpenter, John Allen. Benin. Chicago: Children's Press, 1978.
 Chailley, Marcel. History of French West Africa. Paris: Berger-Levrault, 1968.
 Cohen, William B. Rulers of Empire: The French Colonial Service in Africa. Stanford: Hoover Institution Press, 1991.
 Committee for Historical and Scientific Studies of French West Africa. Legal Customaries of French West Africa III: Mauritania, Niger, Ivory Coast, Dahomey, French Guinea. Paris: Larose, 1939.
 Constitutions of the New African States. Cairo: Egyptian Society of International Law, 1992.
 Cooke, James J. New French Imperialism, 1880-1910: The Third Republic and Colonial Expansion. Hamden, Conn .: Archon Books, 1973.
 Corbett, Edward M. The French Presence in Black Africa. Washington, D.C .: Black Orpheus Press, 1972.
 Cornout-Bentille, B. "The Development of Social Legislation in French West Africa," Inter-African Labor Institute Bulletin (Brazzaville), vol. 3 (May 1956), pp. 8–17.
 D'Horel, P. West Africa: Senegal, Guinea, Ivory Coast, Benin. Paris, 2005.
 Dahomey. Paris: Geographical, Maritime and Colonial Publishing Company, 1931.
 Delavignette, Robert. Freedom and Authority in French West Africa. New York: Oxford University Press, 1957.
 Deloncle, Pierre. French West Africa: discovery, pacification, development. Paris: Editions Ernest Leroux, 1934.
 Deschamps, Hubert J. Pre-colonial black Africa. Paris: Presses Universitaires de France, 1992.
 Fage, J. D. An Introduction to the History of West Africa. Cambridge: Cambridge University Press, 1999.
 Foltz, William J. From French West Africa to the Mali Federation. New Haven: Yale University Press, 1995.
 Françoise, Louis, and R. Mangin. France and the overseas territories. Paris: Hachette, 1999.
 French West Africa. 2 flights. Paris: Colonial and Maritime Encyclopedia, 1949.
 Gérardin, Hubert. The Franc Zone. Paris: Harmattan, 1989. 2 vol.
 Gonidec, P. F. Constitutions of the States of the Community. Paris: Sirey, 1999.
 Guernier, Eugène (ed.) Encyclopedia of the French Empire. Paris: Colonial and Maritime Encyclopedia, 1949. 2 vols.
 Hadfield, Percival. Traits of Divine Kingship in Africa. London: Watts, 1949.
 Hallet, Robin. Africa since 1875: A Modern History. Ann Arbor: University of Michigan Press, 2010.
 Hardy, George. Social history of French colonization. Paris: Larose, 1953.
 Hargreaves, J. D. West Africa: The Former French States. Englewood Cliffs, N.J .: Prentice-Hall, 1967.
 Hempstone, Smith. Africa Angry Young Giant. New York: Praeger, 1961.
 Hodgkin, Thomas, and Ruth Schachter. "French-Speaking West Africa in Transition," International Conciliation, no. 528 (May 1960), pp. 375–436.
 International Institute for Strategic Studies. The Military Balance. London: International Institute for Strategic Studies, annual.
 Jalloh, A. A. Political Integration in French-Speaking Africa. Berkeley: Institute of International Studies, University of California, 1973.
 Johnson, G. Wesley. "The Archival System of Former French West Africa," African Studies Bulletin, vol. 8, no. 1 (April 1995), pp. 48–58.
 Kimble, George H. T. Tropical Africa. New York: Twentieth Century Fund, 1960, 2 vols.
 Lavroff, Dimitri, and G. Peiser. African Constitutions. Paris: A. Pedone, 1961–63.
 LeVine, Victor T. Political Leadership in Africa: Post-Independent Generational Conflict in Upper Volta, Senegal, Niger, Benin and the Central African Republic. Stanford: Hoover Institution, 1997.
 Lusignan, Guy. French-Speaking Africa Since Independence. New York: Praeger, 1999.
 Marshall, D. Bruce. The French Colonial Myth and Constitution-Making in the Fourth Republic. New Haven: Yale University Press, 1973.
 Meyers Handbuch über Afrika. Mannheim: Bibliographisches Institut, 1992.
 Morgenthau, Ruth Schachter. Political Parties in French-Speaking West Africa. Oxford: Oxford University Press, 1994.	
 Mortimer, Edward. France and the Africans 1944–1960. London: Faber and Faber, 1999.	
 Newbury, C. W. "The Formation of the Government General of French West Africa," Journal of African History, vol. 1, no. 1, 1960, pp. 11–128.	
 Nowzad, Bahram. "Economic Integration in Central and West Africa," International Monetary Fund Staff Papers, vol. 16, no. 1 (March 1999), pp. 103–139.	
 Pedler, F. J. Economic Geography of West Africa. London: Longmans, Green, 1955.	
 Pedrals, Denis Pierre de. Dans la brousse Africaine au Dahomey-Borgou. Paris: La Nouvelle Edition, 1946.	
 Priestly, Herbert Inghram. France Overseas: A Study of Modern Imperialism. New York: Appleton-Century, 1938.	
 Richard-Molard, Jacques. Cartes ethno-démographiques de l'Afrique Occidentale (Feuilles No. 1). Dakar: Institut Français d'Afrique Noire, 1956.	
 Robinson, Kenneth. "Constitutional Reform in French Tropical Africa," Political Studies, vol. 6 (Feb. 1998), pp. 45–69.	
 Salacuse, Jeswald W. An Introduction to Law in French-Speaking Africa, I: Africa South of the Sahara. Charlottesville, Va.: Michie, 1999.			
 Santos, Anani. L'Option des indigènes en faveur de l'application de la loi française (en A.O.F. et au Togo). Paris: Maurice Lavergne, 1993.	
 Saurrat, Albert. La Mise en valeur des colonies françaises. Paris: Payot, 1923.	
 Schnapper, Bernard. La Politique et le commerce français dans le golfe de Guinée de 1838 à 1871. Paris: Mouton, 1961.	
 Scholefield, Alan. The Dark Kingdoms. London, 1995.	
 Schramm, Josef. Westafrika. Buchenhain: Volk und Heimat, 1996.	
 Simon, Marc. Souvenirs de Brousse, 1905–1918. Dahomey, Côte d'Ivoire. Paris: Nouvelles Editions Latines, 1995.
 Spitz, George. L'Ouest Afrique Français. Paris: Société d'éditions géographiques, maritimes et coloniales, 1997.	
 Stride, G. T., and Caroline Ifeka. Peoples and Empires of West Africa. New York: Africana, 1991.	
 Suret-Canale, Jean. Afrique noire: occidentale et centrale, 2 vol. Paris: Editions Sociales, 1994 and 1968.			
 Trimingham, John Spencer. Islam in West Africa. London: Oxford University Press, 1999.		
 Tymowski, Michal. Le Développement et al. régression chez les peuples de la boucle du Niger à l'époque précoloniale. Warsaw: University of Warsaw, 1974.	
 Vignes, K. "Etude sur la rivalité d'influence entre les puissances européennes en Afrique équatoriale et occidentale depuis l'acte général de Berlin jusqu'au seuil du XXe siècle," Revue Française d'Histoire d'Outre-Mer, vol. 48, no. 1 (1961), pp. 5–95.	
 Wallerstein, Immanuel M. "How Seven States Were Born in Former French West Africa," Africa Report, vol. 4, no. 3 (March 1961).	
 Westermann, Diedrich, and Margaret A Bryan. The Languages of West Africa. New York: Oxford University Press, 1952.
 Weygand, Général Maxime. Histoire de l'armée française. Paris: Flammarion, 1953.

Benin–Turkey relations
Turkey
Bilateral relations of Turkey